Doubly stochastic may refer to:

 Doubly stochastic model
 Doubly stochastic matrix